Dead Man's Switch: A Crypto Mystery is a Canadian documentary film, directed by Sheona McDonald and released in 2021. The film is a portrait of the controversy around Gerald Cotten, the Canadian cryptocurrency entrepreneur whose death in December 2018 left many investors unable to access their money because Cotten was the only person who knew the password to the firm's cold wallet.

The film premiered in April 2021 at the Hot Docs Canadian International Documentary Festival, before having its television premiere in September on CBC Television and CBC Gem. In December, it premiered on Discovery+ in the United States.

Awards

References

External links

2021 films
2021 documentary films
Canadian documentary films
2020s English-language films
2020s Canadian films